WRHC (1550 kHz) is an AM radio station with a Spanish language talk radio format, simulcasting WWFE.  Licensed to serve Coral Gables, Florida, United States, the station reaches the Miami metropolitan area.  The station is currently owned by Salem Media Group.

The station's name and broadcast callsign are an homage to the former Cuban radio network, RHC-Cadena Azul, which operated from 1939 until 1954.

Previously known as WRIZ until 1985, the station had a phased array of four radio towers in Stiltsville south of Key Biscayne from 1967 to 1990. Because salt water is highly conductive, it makes an excellent ground plane for signals in the mediumwave radio band, allowing the station to travel farther on the same power, although this station's purpose was to put a strong signal across Miami while minimizing its signal toward the Bahamas Islands and a station on 1540..  As with all medium-frequency stations, the towers themselves were mast radiators, connected to the transmitter shack via transmission lines, held in this case a few feet above the water line by pilings.

References

External links
FCC History Cards for WRHC

Cuban-American culture in Miami
Hispanic and Latino American culture in Miami
RHC
RHC
Radio stations established in 1975
Coral Gables, Florida
1975 establishments in Florida